Garima Vikrant Singh (Garima Srivastava) is an Indian actress best known for her role as Saraswati in Life OK's Gustakh Dil. She appeared in shows like, Choti Bahu Season 2, (Zee TV), Phir Subah Hogi (Zee TV), Rahe Tera Aasheervad (Colors), Chand ke paar Chalo (Imagine) and Parivaar (Zee TV). She has also worked with Rajkumar Santoshi's movie Halla Bol. She also  played the role of Dulari in Colors's Ishq Ka Rang Safed. Garima played the role of a Bihari woman in Nimki Mukhiya. She had played the Role of Saroj Rajput at Color's Namak Issk Ka .

Television

Filmography

References

External links
 
 

Living people
Indian soap opera actresses
1987 births
Actresses from Uttar Pradesh